The Norsk Radio Relæ Liga (NRRL) (in English, Norwegian Radio Relay League) is a national non-profit organization for amateur radio enthusiasts in Norway.  Key membership benefits of NRRL include the sponsorship of amateur radio operating awards and radio contests, and a QSL bureau  for those members who regularly communicate with amateur radio operators in other countries.  NRRL publishes a membership magazine called Amatørradio.  NRRL represents the interests of Norwegian amateur radio operators before Norwegian and international telecommunications regulatory authorities.  NRRL is the national member society representing Norway in the International Amateur Radio Union.

See also 
International Amateur Radio Union

References 

Norway
Clubs and societies in Norway
1928 establishments in Norway
Organizations established in 1928
Radio in Norway
Organisations based in Oslo